Catherine of France may refer to:

 Catherine of France, Countess of Montpensier (1378–1388), daughter of Charles V of France
 Catherine of Valois (1401–1437), daughter of Charles VI of France, queen consort of Henry V of England
 Catherine of France, Countess of Charolais (1428–1446), daughter of Charles VII of France, first spouse to Charles I, Duke of Burgundy

See also 
 Catherine of Valois (disambiguation)